Le Monêtier-les-Bains is a commune in the Hautes-Alpes department in southeastern France.

Geography
Le Monêtier-les-Bains is the highest village of the French ski resort of Serre Chevalier at 1,500m. It is situated in the Guisane Valley. The village is on the periphery of the Ecrins National Park.

Climate
Le Monêtier-les-Bains has a humid continental climate (Köppen climate classification Dfb).

Population

Skiing
Monetier's slopes are a part of the extensive Serre Chevalier ski area. There are 7 chairlifts and 4 drag lifts with the highest skiing in the domain at 2760m.

Thermal baths 

Warm water presence in the Monêtier area was already appreciated during the Roman Empire, when the village was known with the name of Stabatio (healing). Between 1715 and the late 19th century Monêtier was renowned for its thermal pools and facilities, which declined during the following century.
From 1999 the new thermal bath of Les grands Bains was opened and, thanks to the following improvement works, Le Monêtier-les-Bains became, again, a popular destination for spa tourism.

Tour de France
The village lies on the Col du Lautaret and is regularly used in the Tour de France. It has featured recently in the tours of 1996, 1999, 2000, 2003, 2005, 2007 and 2008. In the 2011 Tour it was also passed through with about 20 km to go on the 18th stage.

See also
Communes of the Hautes-Alpes department

References

External links
Thermal Bath

Communes of Hautes-Alpes
Hautes-Alpes communes articles needing translation from French Wikipedia